In statistics, the Johansen test, named after Søren Johansen, is a procedure for testing cointegration of several, say k, I(1) time series.  This test permits more than one cointegrating relationship so is more generally applicable than the Engle–Granger test which is based on the Dickey–Fuller (or the augmented) test for unit roots in the residuals from a single (estimated) cointegrating relationship.

There are two types of Johansen test, either with trace or with eigenvalue, and the inferences might be a little bit different. The null hypothesis for the trace test is that the number of cointegration vectors is r = r* < k, vs. the alternative that r = k. Testing proceeds sequentially for r* = 1,2, etc. and the first non-rejection of the null is taken as an estimate of r. The null hypothesis for the "maximum eigenvalue" test is as for the trace test but the alternative is r = r* + 1 and, again, testing proceeds sequentially for r* = 1,2,etc., with the first non-rejection used as an estimator for r.

Just like a unit root test, there can be a constant term, a trend term, both, or neither in the model.  For a general VAR(p) model:

There are two possible specifications for error correction: that is, two vector error correction models (VECM):

1. The longrun VECM:

where

2. The transitory VECM:

where

Be aware that the two are the same. In both VECM,

 

Inferences are drawn on Π, and they will be the same, so is the explanatory power.

References

Further reading 
 
 
 
 

Mathematical finance
Time series statistical tests